A number of world records (WR) and Olympic records (OR) were set in various skating events at these games.

Figure skating

The following new ISU best scores were set during this competition:

Short track speed skating

An Olympic record (OR) was set during the competition.

References

2020 Winter Youth Olympics
2020 Winter Youth Olympics